Richard Conrad Lukas (born 1937) is an American historian and author of books and articles on military, diplomatic, Polish, and Polish-American history. He specializes in the history of Poland during World War II.

Lukas is best known for The Forgotten Holocaust: The Poles Under German Occupation, 1939–1944 (1986), a study of the wartime experiences of the Polish people. Lukas' books have received praise in the mainstream and historical press. Several of his books have received criticism for downplaying antisemitism in wartime Poland and overstating the heroism of Poles in rescuing Jews during the war.

Early life and education
Lukas was born in Lynn, Massachusetts, to Pelagia Lukaszewski (née Kapuscinski) and her husband, Franciszek Lukaszewski. After receiving a BA in 1957, he worked as a research consultant, from 1957 to 1958, at the United States Air Force Historical Archives. He was awarded an MA in 1960 and a PhD from Florida State University in 1963, for a thesis entitled "Air Force Aspects of American Aid to the Soviet Union: The Crucial Years 1941–1942".

Career
Lukas worked at Tennessee Technological University for 26 years from 1963, first as an assistant professor until 1966, then associate professor until 1969, and professor from then until 1989. He moved from Tennessee that year to Wright State University, teaching at its Lake campus until 1992. After this he worked as an adjunct professor of history at the Fort Myers campus of the University of South Florida until retiring in 1995.

Publication history
As a graduate student, Lukas was a contributor to the project that resulted in the publication of Air Force Combat Units of World War II (1961).

Eagles East
Lukas' first book, Eagles East: The Army Air Forces and the Soviet Union, 1941-1945 (1970), a military-diplomatic study based on his doctoral dissertation, earned him the national history award of the American Institute of Aeronautics and Astronautics.

R.S.Hughes commended the book for its "extensive and detailed coverage of Allied-Soviet relations during World War II", and noted that it is particularly helpful for its discussion of the Lend-Lease program. Raymond L. Garthoff writes that it is a "useful study" and "recommended reading" for those interested in the political-military history of USA-USSR relations during World War II with regard to interactions between the U.S. Army Air Forces and the USSR.

James J. Hudson calls the book "an excellent example of military-diplomatic history". Sam Frank, in his review, writes that the book "reflects extensive research and effective writing. An excellent balance has been achieved between factual presentation and interpretation."

The Strange Allies and Bitter Legacy
Lukas wrote two scholarly books on Allied wartime and postwar relations with Poland. His book, The Strange Allies: Poland and the United States, 1941-1945 (1978) studied in-depth the relationship between the United States and the Polish government-in-exile and highlighted the impact of American Polonia in United States-Polish relations. The sequel to The Strange Allies was Bitter Legacy: Polish-American Relations in the Wake of World War II (1982), which dealt with postwar Polish history and Polish-American relations, as well as the aid that was extended to Poland after World War II.

The Forgotten Holocaust

The Forgotten Holocaust: The Poles Under German Occupation, 1939-1944 (1986) is Lukas' most famous work and has been re-published in two subsequent editions. It focuses on the sufferings of ethnic Poles in German- and Soviet-occupied Poland from 1939 to 1945.

The book received mixed reviews. A critical review by David Engel was published in the Slavic Review describing Lukas' book as a one-sided rebuke of "Jewish historians" and detailing "distortion, misrepresentation, and inaccuracy" in the book. An extensive correspondence followed among Lukas, Engel, and others in Slavic Review. Michael R. Marrus wrote in the Washington Post that "Lukas tells this story with an outrage properly contained within the framework of a scholarly narrative" but criticized what he felt was an unjustified "sustained polemic against Jewish historians". George Sanford noted in International Affairs that in tackling difficult subjects including the suffering of ethnic Poles, Lukas' work is "inevitably polemical", even as it is "strictly objective and academic in tone, presentation and content."

Out of the Inferno 
Out of the Inferno: Poles Remember the Holocaust (1989) is a volume edited by Lukas dealing with memoirs of Poles concerning the Holocaust. John Klier noted that the book is "a useful contribution" to the literature about The Holocaust in Poland Jerzy Jan Lerski called the book "timely", but noted it is the weakest of Lukas' books up to date, criticizing it as "uneven, poorly organized and [lacking] focus". The book was also reviewed in German by Dieter Pohl.

Did the Children Cry? 
Lukas's book Did the Children Cry?: Hitler's War Against Jewish and Polish Children, 1939–45 (1994) received the Janusz Korczak Literary Award from the Anti-Defamation League (ADL). The award was accompanied by a two-page analysis by the ADL describing why the book was "problematic in several ways". The biennial prize, awarded to books about children, was recommended by a panel of judges. The ADL decided to withdraw the prize ten days before the award ceremony but reinstated it when Lukas threatened to sue them. According to the ADL, the book "strongly understated the level of anti-Semitism in Poland. It also strongly overstated the number of people who rescued Jews." The ADL cancelled the award ceremony and mailed the $1000 US prize money to Lukas.

Karl A. Schleunes in his review of the book for The American Historical Review noted that it is dealing with an under-research topic, and is a valuable contribution to the studies of Germanization and the Holocaust. He notes that "Lukas makes it a point... to stress "the commonality of suffering of Jewish and Polish children", an effort in which he largely succeeds." Barbara Tepa Lupack writing for The Polish Review wrote that "Lukas in the current volume provides a gripping portrait of the Nazi's systematic genocide plan for all of Poland as well as an excellent analysis of the relationship between Poland's Jewish and gentile communities".

Forgotten Survivors 
Lukas' continuing interest in the Polish tragedy during World War II culminated in his final volume, the Forgotten Survivors: Polish Christians Remember the Nazi Occupation (2004). Isabel Wollaston in her review of the book noted that "if approached as a memorial volume and/or a collection of oral histories, this is a fascinating book", but due to methodological issues and containing mostly primary accounts, "it should be handled with care and needs to be supplemented and contextualized from other sources if it is to be used for scholarly purposes".

Bibliography

Books
 Air Force Combat Units of World War II (contributing author), USGPO, 1961; Franklin Watts, 1963.
 Eagles East: The Army Air Forces and the Soviet Union, 1941-1945, Florida State University Press, 1970, .
 From Metternich to the Beatles, Mentor, 1973, .
 The Strange Allies: the United States and Poland, 1941-1945, University of Tennessee Press, 1978, .
 Bitter Legacy: Polish-American Relations in the Wake of World War II, University Press of Kentucky, 1982, .
 Out of the Inferno: Poles Remember the Holocaust, University Press of Kentucky, 1989, .
 The Forgotten Holocaust: The Poles Under German Occupation, 1939-1944, University of Kentucky Press, 1986; Hippocrene Books, 1990; second revised edition, 1997; third revised edition, 2012, .
 Did the Children Cry: Hitler's War Against Jewish and Polish Children, 1939-1945, Hippocrene Books, 2001, .
 Forgotten Survivors: Polish Christians Remember the Nazi Occupation, University Press of Kansas, 2004, .

Articles
 "The Polish Experience during the Holocaust," in A Mosaic of Victims, New York University Press, 1990 
 "The Merchandising of the Holocaust", Catalyst magazine, Catholic League for Religious and Civil Rights, October 31, 1997
 "Of Stereotypes and Heroes", Catalyst magazine, Catholic League for Religious and Civil Rights, July–August 2002
 "Why Do We Allow Non-Jewish Victims to be Forgotten?"
 "Their Legacy is Life", Canadian Messenger, 1991
 "Jedwabne and the Selling of the Holocaust", Inside the Vatican, November 2001; reprinted in The Neighbors Respond: The Controversy over the Jedwabne Massacre in Poland, Princeton University Press, 2004 
 "Irena Sendler: World War II's Polish Angel", St. Anthony Messenger, August 2008
 "Rozmowa z Prof. Richardem Lukasem" ("A Conversation with Prof. Richard Lukas"), Uwazam Rze Historia, wrzesień (September) 2012
 "The Encounter" (fiction), Liguorian, March 2013
 "God and Country: Catholic Chaplains during World War II", The Priest, June, 2014
 "I'll Be Seeing You: The Warsaw Uprising and the Akins Crew", The Elks Magazine, June, 2014
 "To Save a Life," The Priest, January 2015
 "Marcus Shook: A Mississippi Hero," in Mississippi History Now, November 2016
 "Don't Sit on the Torpedo!" (fiction), Liguorian, November 2017

Awards
He has received awards for his work:
 National History Award of the American Institute of Aeronautics and Astronautics (1971)
 Fellow, American Council of Learned Societies, (1980)
 Doctor of Humane Letters, from Alliance College, (1987)
 Kosciuszko Foundation's Joseph B. Slotkowski Publication Fund Achievement Award
 Order of Polonia Restituta, from the Government of Poland (1988)
 Janusz Korczak Literary Award, from the Anti-Defamation League of B'nai B'rith (1994)
 American Council for Polish Culture Cultural Achievement Award (1994)
 Waclaw Jedrzejewicz History Award, from the Józef Piłsudski Institute of America (2000)
 The Catholic Press Association Award (2009)
 Mieczyslaw Haiman Award, presented by the Polish American Historical Association, (2013)

Notes

External links
 Richard C. Lukas's homepage
 Bitter Legacy: Polish-American Relations in the Wake of the World War II - Book review.
 Forgotten Survivors. Polish Christians Remember the Nazi Occupation - Book review, The Sarmatian Review, January 2006

21st-century American historians
21st-century American male writers
Living people
Recipients of the Order of Polonia Restituta
Wright State University faculty
1937 births
Historians of Polish Americans
Historians of World War II
People from Lynn, Massachusetts
Historians from Massachusetts
American male non-fiction writers
American people of Polish descent